{{Speciesbox
| image = Euphorbia mauretanica MS 9595.jpg 
| status = Least Concern
| status_system = SANBI
| status_ref = 
| genus = Euphorbia
| species = mauritanica
| authority =  L.
| synonyms = 
| synonyms_ref = <ref name="POWO">{{cite POWO |id=347292-1 |title=Euphorbia mauritanica |accessdate=15 April 2022}}</ref>
}}Euphorbia mauritanica, commonly known as  yellow milk bush or golden spurge''', is a species of plant in the family Euphorbiaceae native to Africa.

 Distribution Euphorbia mauritanica'' is found in most of Southern Africa. It occurs extensively throughout the Northern Cape, Western Cape, Eastern Cape, Free State and KwaZulu-Natal, as well as in Namibia. It is dominant in the Succulent Karoo, in valleys and on hillsides. It has been introduced to India.

References

External links 

 
 

mauritanica
mauritanica
Flora of Southern Africa